The 2018 Mini Challenge season was the seventeenth season of the Mini Challenge UK. The season started on 31 March at Oulton Park and ended on 29 September at Rockingham Motor Speedway. The season featured thirteen rounds across the UK.

Calendar

Entry list

Results

JCW Class

Open Class

Cooper Pro Class

Cooper Am Class

Championship standings
Scoring system
Championship points were awarded for the first 34 positions in each Championship Race. Entries were required to complete 75% of the winning car's race distance in order to be classified and earn points. There were bonus points awarded for Pole Position and Fastest Lap.

Championship Race points

Notes
1 2 3 4 5 6 refers to the classification of the fastest laps, where bonus points are awarded 6–5–4–3–2–1.
1 2 3 4 5 6 refers to the classification of the drivers after the qualifying for the race 1, where bonus points are awarded 6–5–4–3–2–1.

Drivers' Championship

JCW Class

{|
|

Open Class

{|
|

Cooper Pro Class

{|
|

Cooper Am Class

{|
|

References

Mini Challenge UK
Mini Challenge UK